The PVC-170 is a patrol boat class built for the Angolan Navy by Aresa (Barcelona, Spain) in 2009 for Angolan fishery
protection duties under Spanish Fisheries Department aid programme.

References

External links 
, Infodefensa Specifications

Military of Angola
Patrol boat classes